Little Things is a 2010 iOS game by Australian studio KLICKTOCK. A sequel entitled Little Things Forever was released on May 31, 2012. In this version, it is a hidden object game, where users attempt to find specific items called "colorful patchworks" hidden in a larger design made up of thousands of "little things" in a list. 

A newer version of the game, called Little Things Remastered was released on Itch.io website for Windows, Mac OS and Android for free, including levels from the original game and Forever.

Critical reception

Little Things
148apps gave it 4 stars, writing "Lose yourself in Little Things. It might be one of the simplest, purest pleasures you've experienced on the iPad yet." PadGagdte gave it 4.5/5 stars, commenting "Little Things is a fun game for everyone. If you like games that challenge you by finding lots of hidden objects, this game will bring a relaxing game-play time for you and others. The game is great for any occasion because it’s simple and fun, but yet brings a lot of challenges for you. It’s a very good download for your iPad." TapScape said "Little Things is a fun little iSpy like game with a cartoonish design and timeless feel. This is a great game to have on hand for found moments and gameplay for the entire family." SlideToPlay gave it 3/4, writing " Little Things has a great new approach to hidden object games, but could use some greater optimization. "

Little Things Forever
Little Things Forever has a rating on Metacritic of 90% based on 5 critic reviews.

Gamezebo said " For three dollars (or five in HD)? This is a game for everyone. " AppSpy wrote " Little Things Forever revisits a classic formula, pairing it with amazing visual design and simple mechanics that prove to be incredibly addictive. " 148Apps said " Little Things Forever won't appeal to those who like tons of action or marauding zombies, but for the mellower solving set and as a family activity it's a delight. It's also the rare game where I urge you to turn the volume up – even the music makes for a wonderfully addictive experience. " PocketGamerUK said " A sublimely understated hidden object game that shows that, sometimes, subtle improvements to a strong foundation are all a sequel needs. " TouchArcade wrote " On every level, Little Things Forever hits all of the right notes: it is easy to pick up, fun to play alone or with a friend, simple yet challenging, and extremely replayable. Fan of the genre or skeptic, there are few games to be found on iOS that are as worth the price as this one. "

References

2010 video games
Android (operating system) games
IOS games
Hidden object games
Video games developed in Australia
Single-player video games